Hamadi Ould Baba Ould Hamadi (born 31 December 1948) is a Mauritanian politician. As of 2011, he is the Minister for Foreign Affairs and Cooperation of Mauritania.

Early life
Hamadi was born in Moudjeria, then part of the French Colony of Mauritania. He attended primary school in Moudjeria and Aleg from 1956 to 1961. He attended secondary school between in Atar, Rosso, and Nouakchott from 1962 to 1966. He attended the National School for Administration from 1966 to 1968, graduating with a Degree in Civil Engineering.

Career
From 1968 to 1978, he worked as an official at the Ministry of Public Works, and from October 1983 to November 1990 worked as Secretary General of FIAP. He worked as a consultant and project manager at DGPIP until May 2007.

Defense
After Mohamed Ould Abdel Aziz was elected president of Mauritania in the 2009 presidential election, Aziz appointed Hamadi the position of Minister of National Defense.

Foreign Minister
Hamadi met with Romania's former foreign minister, Titus Corlățean, on 29 September 2012. Both foreign ministers discussed about the possibility of reestablishing relations between the two countries.

On 25 May 2013, Hamadi attended the African Union Summit. While there, he spoke about the crises in Mali and Sahel with Ban Ki-moon, the Secretary-General of the United Nations.

A few months later, on 18 September 2013, Hamadi was replaced by Ahmed Ould Teguedi as Foreign Minister in a Cabinet reshuffle. Hamadai was named as the new Minister of Fishing.

Personal life
He is married and has a child.

References

Living people
Mauritanian diplomats
1948 births
Foreign ministers of Mauritania
People from Tagant Region